Basil W. Brown (March 20, 1927 – October 30, 1997) was an American politician and lawyer.

Born in Vandalia, Michigan, Brown moved with his family to Battle Creek, Michigan. Brown graduated from Battle Creek Central High School. He served in the United States Navy during World War II. Brown then received his bachelor's degree Western Michigan University and his law degree from University of Michigan Law School. He practiced law. From 1957 to 1988, Brown served in the Michigan State Senate and was a Democrat.

Brown resigned from the Michigan Senate in 1988 when he was arrested on drug-related charges. The Michigan Supreme Court later reversed the drug-related conviction due to entrapment concerns and the charges were later dropped.

Brown died as a result of a fire at his home in Highland Park, Michigan and was treated for cancer.

Notes

1927 births
1997 deaths
African-American lawyers
African-American state legislators in Michigan
Military personnel from Michigan
United States Navy personnel of World War II
People from Cass County, Michigan
Western Michigan University alumni
University of Michigan Law School alumni
Michigan lawyers
Democratic Party Michigan state senators
20th-century American politicians
People from Battle Creek, Michigan
People from Highland Park, Michigan
Deaths from cancer in Michigan
20th-century American lawyers
20th-century African-American politicians
African-American men in politics